The Trout River Formation is a stratigraphical unit of Late Devonian age in the Western Canadian Sedimentary Basin. 

Lithology
The Trout River Formation is composed bedded limestone (top), silty limestone and shale (middle), silty limestone and calcareous siltstone (base).

Brachiopod and coral paleo-fauna can be found in outcrops.

Distribution
It occurs in the District of Mackenzie in outcrop and dips south into the Fort Nelson area in north-eastern British Columbia.

Relationship to other units

The Trout River Formation is conformably overlain by the Tetcho Formation and disconformably overlays the Kakisa Formation. In its western extent, it overlies and grades into the Fort Simpson Formation.

It is equivalent to the Sassenach Formation in the central Alberta Rockies, with the Graminia Formation in central Alberta, the Crowfoot Formation in southern Alberta, the Torquay Formation in Saskatchewan and Lyleton Formation in Manitoba.

References

Stratigraphy of British Columbia
Stratigraphy of the Northwest Territories